The 2018 Autobacs Super GT Series was the twenty-sixth season of the Japan Automobile Federation Super GT Championship including the All Japan Grand Touring Car Championship (JGTC) era and the fourteenth season the series has competed under the Super GT name. It was the thirty-sixth overall season of a national JAF sportscar championship dating back to the All Japan Sports Prototype Championship. The season began on April 8 and ended on November 11, after 8 races.

In the GT500 class, Team Kunimitsu won their first-ever championship with the all-star lineup of series veteran Naoki Yamamoto and 2009 Formula One champion Jenson Button, narrowly beating defending champions Ryō Hirakawa and Nick Cassidy at the final race in Motegi to clinch the title after both teams came in to the race tied in points. It was the first championship title for Honda in the GT500 class since 2010. Yamamoto, who had won the 2018 Super Formula title before the season finale, became just the fourth driver to win both the GT500 and Super Formula titles in the same year, while Button became the first rookie to win the GT500 title since Tora Takagi in 2005. 

In the GT300 class, the No. 65 LEON CVSTOS AMG fielded by K2 R&D LEON Racing won the championship in Motegi after overcoming a 12-point deficit over the then-points leader No. 55 ARTA BMW, giving series veteran Haruki Kurosawa and Naoya Gamou their first championship title in the series. The No. 55 ARTA team, despite winning two races in the season, were ultimately too inconsistent in their championship challenge, as two races without scoring a point coupled with poor performance in both Sugo and Motegi ultimately cost them the championship over the more consistent LEON AMG. The No. 31 Toyota Prius apr GT of Koki Saga and Kohei Hirate would finish third, just one point behind the ARTA BMW, while defending champions Goodsmile Racing finished fourth after a poor start to the season and a tire issue in Autopolis ultimately cost them the chance to defend the title.

Schedule

Schedule Changes
 On March 4, 2017, Suzuka Circuit, the Stéphane Ratel Organisation, and the GT Association announced that the Suzuka 1000km would become the Suzuka 10 Hours from 2018, and moves to the Intercontinental GT Challenge.  The Super GT championship round at Suzuka moves to May 19–20 and will be a 300km race, as it was from 1995 to 2010.
 To replace the Suzuka 1000km as the series' endurance round, the Fuji GT 300km, held in early August, was lengthened to a 500 mile (804 kilometer) race. The Fuji 500 Mile Race was originally held from 1977 to 1992.
 The race at Buriram United International Circuit in Thailand was moved from the seventh to the fourth round of the championship, on June 30 – July 1.
 The race at Sportsland Sugo was moved from the fourth to the sixth round of the championship, on September 15–16.
 The race at Autopolis was moved from the third to the seventh round of the championship, on October 20–21.

Teams and drivers

GT500

GT300
 

Notes

Driver Changes

Team Transfers
 Honda: 2009 Formula 1 World Champion Jenson Button, who made his series debut with Team Mugen at the 2017 Suzuka 1000km, will run full-time with Honda and Team Kunimitsu in 2018. Takuya Izawa moves from Team Kunimitsu to Autobacs Racing Team Aguri, replacing Takashi Kobayashi.
 Toyota: Former F1, and current WEC and Super Formula driver Kamui Kobayashi will make his full-time GT500 debut with Lexus Team SARD; Yuhi Sekiguchi replaces James Rossiter at Lexus Team au TOM's, and Toyota young driver Kenta Yamashita moves up to GT500 full-time with Lexus Team WedsSport BANDOH, replacing Sekiguchi. Two-time GT500 champion Kohei Hirate moves out of GT500 to drive the #31 Toyota Prius for apr Racing.
 Nissan: Reigning All-Japan Formula 3 Champion Mitsunori Takaboshi steps up to GT500 full-time with Kondo Racing, replacing Daiki Sasaki, who moves over to Team Impul to drive the Calsonic GT-R. Satoshi Motoyama and Katsumasa Chiyo move from MOLA to their replacement team, NDDP Racing with B-Max.
 Former GT500 driver Hironobu Yasuda and two-time GT300 champion Kazuki Hoshino move to Gainer, from Team Impul and NDDP Racing respectively, to drive their new Nissan GT-R NISMO GT3s.
 Toyota young driver Sho Tsuboi will replace Kenta Yamashita at Tsuchiya Engineering.
 Three-time GT300 champion Morio Nitta moves to LM Corsa Lexus RC F GT3 to replace Sho Tsuboi.
 Rintaro Kubo moves from apr Racing, and Keishi Ishikawa moves from Rn-sports, to Pacific with Gulf Racing.

Entering Super GT
 Formula E standout Felix Rosenqvist will make his Super GT debut in the GT500 class for Lexus Team Wako's LeMans.
 Two-time FIA F4 Japanese Champion Ritomo Miyata makes his series debut with LM Corsa.
 Former All-Japan Formula 3 race winner Hiroki Otsu makes his series debut with Modulo Drago Corse.
 Gentleman racer Takeshi Kimura makes his series debut with CarGuy Racing.
 FIA F4 Japanese graduate Yuya Hiraki makes his series debut with Team Mach, replacing Kiyoto Fujinami as Natsu Sakaguchi's co-driver.
 Bentley factory driver Jules Gounon makes his Super GT debut in a one-off for EIcars Bentley at the Fuji 500-mile race.

Returning to Super GT 
 2000 GT500 Champion Ryo Michigami returns to the series as a full-time competitor with his Modulo Drago Corse team, after racing in the World Touring Car Championship in 2017.
 Naoki Yokomizo, the 2012 GT300 Champion, returns after a year-long hiatus to drive for the new CarGuy Racing team.
 Masaki Kano and Hideto Yasuoka both return to the series with Arnage Racing.

Leaving Super GT
 Andrea Caldarelli confirmed that he would leave Toyota and Super GT this season, focusing solely on his commitments as a factory driver at Lamborghini Squadra Corse.
 James Rossiter stepped away from full-time Super GT racing in 2018, but will continue to race in Japan in the Super Formula championship.
 Akira Iida will step away from full-time driving duties, and became team director of the #60 LM Corsa Lexus RC F GT3.
 Jono Lester was released from Pacific with Gulf Racing after the 2017 season, and will not return to Super GT in 2018 – but did pledge to return to the series in the future.

Team Changes
 NDDP Racing moved up to the GT500 class for 2018, entering as NDDP Racing with B-Max. They take the place of MOLA, who withdrew from the series at the end of 2017.
 BMW Team Studie, the 2011 GT300 class Champion(by then co-joint with Goodsmile Racing) announced in January that they would switch to the Blancpain GT Series Asia GT4 category, and suspended operations in Super GT for the foreseeable future.
 CarGuy Racing makes their Super GT debut with the all-new Honda NSX GT3. They previously competed in the Super Taikyu Series and Blancpain GT Series Asia.
 Drago Corse, who competed from 2015 to 2016 as Drago Modulo Honda Racing, return to the series in GT300 with another Honda NSX GT3. They will be known as Modulo Drago Corse.
 VivaC Team Tsuchiya reverted to their original name, Tsuchiya Engineering, following the withdrawal of their title sponsor VivaC.
 The #51 LM Corsa Lexus RC F GT3 changes its number to #96, and has a new title sponsor in Okayama Toyopet / K-Tunes Racing. The team will be officially known as K-Tunes Racing LM Corsa from 2018.
 Panther Team Thailand switched from the Dome-built Toyota 86 MC to the Lexus RC F GT3.
 Gainer switched to a full-on effort with Nissan, fielding two brand-new 2018 Nissan GT-R NISMO GT3s.
 Arnage Racing separated from INGING Motorsport after one season, and also switch vehicles to the Mercedes-AMG GT3.

Results

Championship Standings

Drivers' championships

Scoring system

GT500

GT300

References

External links
 Official website

2018